Howard Scholer Liebengood (December 29, 1942 – January 13, 2005) was an American lawyer and lobbyist. A protégé of Senator Howard Baker, he served as Sergeant at Arms of the United States Senate from 1981 to 1983 before leaving to become a lobbyist for the Tobacco Institute. He later served as chief of staff to Senators Fred Thompson and Bill Frist.

Life and career
Liebengood was born in South Bend, Indiana, and raised in Plymouth, Indiana. He received his undergraduate degree from Kansas State University and earned his law degree in Vanderbilt University Law School in Nashville, Tennessee in 1967. At Vanderbilt, Liebengood met Fred Thompson, who became a close and lifelong friend. Liebengood served in the U.S. Army military police from 1968 to 1970, including in Vietnam, and was decorated with the Bronze Star and Army Commendation Medal. He was a lawyer in Nashville, before becoming minority (Republican) counsel to the Senate Watergate Committee in 1973. In 1974, he and Thompson co-founded a law firm in Nashville.

In 1975, Liebengood returned to Washington to work as a consultant for the Church Committee (Senate Select Committee to Study Governmental Operations with Respect to Intelligence Activities). The next year, he became minority staff director of the Senate Select Committee on Intelligence. In 1980, he became legislative counsel to Senator Howard Baker. Liebengood and William Hildenbrand were Baker's two leading advisors.

From 1981, Liebengood became sergeant-at-arms of the U.S. Senate; in that role, he supervised more than 1,200 employees, including 500 Capitol Police officers, 185 computer specialists, nine carpenters, and seven barbers. In 1983, Liebengood stepped down to become executive vice president for federal relations at the Tobacco Institute. In 1984, Liebengood and Martin B. Gold established the lobbying firm Gold and Liebengood, which lobbied on behalf of clients such as the Chemical Manufacturers Association, Federal Express, Fiat, Martin Marietta and the Hopi tribe. In 1989, Burson-Marsteller purchased the firm, and Liebengood moved to the Powell, Goldstein, Frazer & Murphy law firm before becoming the head lobbyist for the Philip Morris Companies Inc. in 1995. In 2001, he became chief of staff to Thompson, who had become a U.S. senator; in 2003, after Thompson retired, Liebengood became chief of staff to Republican Senator Bill Frist of Tennessee, the Senate Majority Leader.

On January 13, 2005, one month after retiring, Liebengood died at his home in Vienna, Virginia, of a heart attack.

Family
Liebengood was married and had three children. His son, Howard "Howie" Liebengood, was an officer of the United States Capitol Police from April 2005 until his death by suicide at the age of 51, on January 9, 2021. The younger Liebengood had been on duty during the storming of the United States Capitol three days before his death.

References

1942 births
2005 deaths
20th-century American lawyers
American lobbyists
Indiana Republicans
Kansas State University alumni
People from Plymouth, Indiana
People from South Bend, Indiana
Sergeants at Arms of the United States Senate
Vanderbilt University Law School alumni